The Ministry of Finance (MOF) is the ministry of the Republic of China (Taiwan) responsible for government revenue, taxation, treasury, government land properties, customs in Taiwan. The current minister is Su Jain-rong.

The Ministry of Finance also manages the administration of government land, tobacco and alcohol, deposit insurance for banking customers and export-import banking services.

Structure

Internal Structure
The internal structure of the agency is comprised:
Department of General Affairs
Department of International Fiscal Affairs
Department for the Promotion of Private Participation
Department of Secretarial
Department of Personnel
Department of Government Ethics
Department of Accounting
Department of Statistics
Department of Legal Affairs

Administrative Agencies
The Ministry of Finance has a number of subordinate agencies reporting to it. They are:
 National Treasury Administration
 Taxation Administration
 National Property Administration
 Customs Administration
 National Taxation Bureau of Taipei
 National Taxation Bureau of Kaohsiung
 National Taxation Bureau of the Northern Area
 National Taxation Bureau of the Central Area
 National Taxation Bureau of the Southern Area
 Fiscal Information Agency
 Training Institute

Local Agencies under supervision
The following agencies report to the Ministry of Finance of the central government are:
Bureau of Finance, Taipei Municipal Government
Bureau of Finance, Kaohsiung Municipal Government

Government corporations
These state-owned corporations report to the Ministry of Finance:

 Taiwan Tobacco and Liquor Corporation
 Bank of Taiwan
 Land Bank of Taiwan
 Export–Import Bank of the Republic of China

List of Ministers of Finance

The following is a list of finance ministers of the Republic of China.

Nationalist government during 1927–1947
Sun Fo (孫科) 1927-1928
T. V. Soong (宋子文) 1928–1933
H. H. Kung (孔祥熙) 1933–1944

Constitutional government since 1948

Access
The MOF building is accessible from Jingmei Station of the Taipei Metro on the Green Line.

See also
 Economy of Taiwan
 List of banks in Taiwan

Notes and references

 Ministry of Finance, 歷任部長基本資料, retrieved 2005-03-02.

1912 establishments in China
Finance
Republic of China, Finance
Taiwan
Finance in Taiwan